George Keene Schweitzer (born December 5, 1924) is an academic in chemistry and family history and local history. He has also studied history of science and philosophy of science, for which he was awarded the Sc.D.

Schweitzer was born in Poplar Bluff, Missouri.  He received his B.A. in chemistry from Central College in 1945 and an M.S. and Ph.D. in chemistry in 1946 and 1948 from the University of Illinois . He received his M. A. in history of religion from Columbia University in 1961 and his Ph.D. in history from New York University in 1964. His Sc.D. was awarded in 1966.

He became a professor of chemistry at the University of Tennessee in 1948 and became an Alumni Distinguished Professor at that university in 1970. He has been acknowledged as one of the longest-working employees at UT, and estimates he has taught chemistry to more than 45,000 students during his career. He has done and continues to do research and consult with several of the facilities at Oak Ridge National Laboratory: K-25, Y-12, ORNL, ORAU, AEC, UT-AEC, ARP. His research relates to PET body scanners and fission studies.

He held a National Science Foundation faculty fellowship in 1959–1960 at Columbia, and has lectured extensively at numerous other universities.  Schweitzer has published over 160 papers including 18 guidebooks on family history research.

Sources
https://www.chem.utk.edu/faculty/gschweitzer
http://www.yogs.com/OtherPubs/GeorgeSchweitzer.htm
Who's Who in America'' 44th Edition, p. 2498

References

1924 births
21st-century American chemists
American genealogists
Living people
University of Illinois alumni
University of Tennessee faculty
21st-century American historians
21st-century American male writers
Columbia University alumni
New York University alumni
Chemists from Missouri
American male non-fiction writers